Bost may refer to:

Places
Alternative name for Lashkargah, Afghanistan
Boost Defenders, a cricket team from the region
Bost Airport, near Lashkargah
Bost, Allier, a commune in central France

People
Bost (Μποστ) (1918–1995), pen name of Chrysanthos Mentis Bostantzoglou, Greek playwright, painter, and cartoonist
 Carlton Bost (born 1975), American musician
 Dee Bost (born 1989), American professional basketball player
 Eric M. Bost, United States Ambassador to South Africa, 2006–2009
 Jacques-Laurent Bost (1916–1990), French journalist
 John Bost (1817–1881), Swiss Calvinist pastor and musician
 Joseph Bost (born 1956), American judoka
 Josiane Bost (born 1956), former French racing cyclist
 Matthieu Bost, one half of the French dancehall reggae production team Bost & Bim
 Mike Bost (born 1960), American politician from Illinois
 Paul Bost (1905–1974), American racecar driver

Other uses 
 Bankside Open Spaces Trust (BOST), a charity operating in London
 Bost Motorsports, a former NASCAR Busch Series team owned by Danny Bost
 Bost's Bread, a brand of baked bread formerly distributed in the Western Carolinas, Virginia and Tennessee
 Bost Building, also known as Columbia Hotel, a historic landmark in Homestead, Pennsylvania
 Bost University, a private, non-sectarian university in Lashkarga, Helmand Province, Afghanistan

See also
 Burst (village), Belgium